Freshwater is any naturally occurring water except seawater and brackish water.

Freshwater or Fresh Water may also refer to:

Places

Australia 
Freshwater, New South Wales
Freshwater, Queensland
Freshwater railway station, Queensland
Freshwater National Park, a national park in Queensland

Canada 
 Freshwater, Bell Island, Newfoundland and Labrador
 Freshwater, Conception Bay, Newfoundland and Labrador
 Freshwater, Placentia Bay, Newfoundland and Labrador

United Kingdom 
 Freshwater, Isle of Wight, England
Freshwater railway station
 Freshwater East and Freshwater West, Wales

United States 
Freshwater, California
Freshwater, Virginia

People
 Benzion Freshwater (born 1948), British property investor
 John Freshwater (born 1956), controversial Ohio science teacher
 Perry Freshwater (born 1973), English rugby player

Arts and entertainment
 Freshwater (film), a 2016 American thriller film
 Fresh Water (film), a 2021 Canadian documentary film
 Freshwater (opera), by Andy Vores, 1994
 Freshwater (play), by Virginia Woolf, 1935
 Fresh Water (album), by Alison MacCallum, 1972
 Freshwater High, a fictional school in TV series Fish Hooks
Freshwater (novel), by Akwaeke Emezi

Other uses
 Freshwater tribe, or Agua Dulce people, a Timucua people of northeastern Florida
 Freshwater people, Aboriginal and Torres Strait Islander people 
 Saltwater and freshwater economics
 LB&SCR A1X Class W8 Freshwater, a steam locomotive on the Isle of Wight Steam Railway
 Freshwater-class ferry, an Australian ferry

See also

 Freshwater Bay (disambiguation)
 Freshwater Beach
 Freshwater East
 Freshwater Place
 Freshwater River, New Zealand
 Freshwater Senior Campus
 Freshwater West